The 1996 NCAA Division I softball season, play of college softball in the United States organized by the National Collegiate Athletic Association (NCAA) at the Division I level, began in February 1996.  The season progressed through the regular season, many conference tournaments and championship series, and concluded with the 1996 NCAA Division I softball tournament and 1996 Women's College World Series.  The Women's College World Series, consisting of the eight remaining teams in the NCAA Tournament and held in Columbus, Georgia at Golden Park, ended on May 27, 1996.

Conference standings

Women's College World Series
The 1996 NCAA Women's College World Series took place from May 23 to May 37, 1996 in Columbus, Georgia.  The event was held at the same venue that would later host the softball events of the 1996 Summer Olympics.

Season leaders
Batting
Batting average: .514 – Jennifer Weaver, Towson Tigers
RBIs: 109 – Jenny Dalton, Arizona Wildcats
Home runs: 25 – Jenny Dalton, Arizona Wildcats

Pitching
Wins: 35-6 – Carrie Dolan, Arizona Wildcats
ERA: 0.48 (16 ER/230.2 IP) – Trinity Johnson, South Carolina Gamecocks
Strikeouts: 351 – Audrey West, Boston Terriers

Records
NCAA Division I season doubles:
29 – Nina Lindenberg, Fresno State Bulldogs

NCAA Division I single game stolen bases:
7 – Stacy Hughes, Tennessee Tech Golden Eagles; April 14, 1996

Sophomore class RBIs:
96 – Leticia Pineda, Arizona Wildcats

Senior class season of perfect stolen bases:
47-47 – Gina Freeman, South Carolina Lady Bulldogs

Team doubles:
142 – Tennessee Volunteers

Awards
Honda Sports Award Softball:
Jenny Dalton, Arizona Wildcats

All America Teams
The following players were members of the All-American Teams.

First Team

Second Team

Third Team

References

External links